Avançon is a commune in the Ardennes département in the Grand Est region of northern France.

The inhabitants of the commune are known as Avançonnais or Avançonnaises.

Geography
Avançon is located some 10 km south-west of Rethel and 11 km east of Asfeld. Access to the commune is by the D18 road from Acy-Romance in the north-east which passes through the commune to the village near the centre then continues west to Blanzy-la-Salonnaise. The D26 road goes from the village north to Taizy. The D150 goes south-west from the village to Saint-Loup-en-Champagne. The commune is entirely farmland.

Neighbouring communes and villages

Heraldry

Administration

List of Successive Mayors

Demography
In 2017 the commune had 313 inhabitants.

Culture and heritage

Religious heritage
The commune has one religious building that is registered as an historical monument:
The Church of Saint Remi (13th century) The Church contains one item that is registered as an historical object:
An Eagle Lectern (18th century)

Notable people linked to the commune
Renée Mayot, medal engraver, born in 1947.

See also
Communes of the Ardennes department

References

External links
Avançon on the old IGN website 
Avançon on Géoportail, National Geographic Institute (IGN) website 
Avançon on the 1750 Cassini Map

Communes of Ardennes (department)